Adam Rundkvist (born July 14, 1990) is a Swedish  professional ice hockey player. He played with Färjestads BK in the Elitserien during the 2010–11 Elitserien season.

References

External links

1990 births
Färjestad BK players
Living people
Swedish ice hockey centres
Sportspeople from Karlstad